Maria Laina (born 1947) is a Greek poet. She read Law at the University of Athens, but she did not practice it, and has worked instead as a translator, critic, screenwriter, copy editor, professor of Greek and radio producer.

She belongs to the so-called Genia tou 70, which is a literary term referring to Greek authors who began publishing their work during the 1970s, especially towards the end of the Greek military junta of 1967–1974 and at the first years of the Metapolitefsi.

She was awarded the State Prize for Poetry for her collection Ρόδινος φόβος in 1993, and the Cavafy together with Giorgos Markopoulos in 1996. Her poetry has been translated into English, French and Spanish.

Selected works

Poetry
Ενηλικίωση (Coming of Age), 1968
Επέκεινα (Hereafter), 1970
Αλλαγή τοπίου (A Change of Landscape), 1972
Σημεία στίξεως (Punctuation Marks), 1979
Δικό της (Of her own), 1985
Ρόδινος φόβος (Rose fear), 1992 and in English translated by Sarah McCann
Εδώ (Here), 2003

Translations
Pound, Ezra, Η Αλφαβήτα της μελέτης (ABC of Reading), 1974
Mansfield, Katherine, Μακαριότητα (Bliss), 1981
Eliot, T. S., Για την ποίηση (On Poetry and Poets), 1982

References

External links
Her entry for the 2001 Frankfurt Book Fair (Greek)
Her page at the website of the Hellenic Authors' Society (Greek)

1947 births
Living people
Writers from Patras
National and Kapodistrian University of Athens alumni
Greek women poets
Modern Greek poets
20th-century Greek poets
20th-century women writers
Poets from Achaea